Eis or EIS may refer to:

Education
 Eastern Independent Schools of Melbourne, in Australia
 Educational Institute of Scotland, a trade union
 Ekamai International School, in Bangkok, Thailand
 English for Integrated Studies, a program in Thailand
 English International School Moscow, a school network in Moscow, Russia
 Era International School, in Andhra Pradesh, India
 Escuela Internacional Sampedrana, a school in San Pedro Sula, Honduras
 Essence International School, in Kaduna, Nigeria
 European International School, in Parañaque City, Philippines
 European International School Ho Chi Minh City, in Vietnam

Government 
 Enhanced Imaging System, an American satellite program
 Enterprise Investment Scheme, series of UK Tax reliefs
 Epidemic Intelligence Service, a program of the US Centers for Disease Control and Prevention

Health and medicine 
 Emergency Infant Services, an American charity
 Estrogen insensitivity syndrome

People 
 Egon Eis (1910–1994), Austrian screenwriter
 Frederick Eis (1843–1926), German-American Catholic bishop
 Maria Eis (1896–1954), Austrian actress
 Otto Eis (1903–1952), Austrian-American screenwriter

Science and technology 
 Electrochemical impedance spectroscopy
 Electrolyte–insulator–semiconductor sensor
 Electronic image stabilization
 Embryo-carrying interstellar starship, a concept in space colonization
 Enterprise information system
 Evolving intelligent system
 Executive information system
 Extreme Ice Survey
 Extreme-ultraviolet Imaging Spectrometer, an instrument on board the Hinode satellite
Effective Isotropic Sensitivity

Other uses 
 Eisbach (Rhine), a river in Germany
 Edmonton International Speedway, in Alberta, Canada
 English Institute of Sport, a network of sports related services
 Environmental impact statement, in the United States
 Expressive Intelligence Studio, a game design research group at University of California, Santa Cruz
 Terrance B. Lettsome International Airport, in the British Virgin Islands
 E♯ (musical note)